This is a list of Bengali language films released in India in the year 2019.

January–March

April–June

July–September

October–December

References

External links

B*
Bengali
2019